"Sweet and Low" is a song by American singer Debbie Harry, released as the fourth single from her third solo studio album, Def, Dumb & Blonde (1989).

Song information
"Sweet and Low" was released as the third single from the Def, Dumb & Blonde album in the UK, where it peaked at number 57. "Sweet and Low" also reached number 17 on the US Dance Club Songs chart.

In Australia, "Sweet and Low" was the second single released from the album, and was issued as a double A-side with "Kiss It Better". The single peaked at number 30 in Australia.

The single version of "Sweet and Low" was remixed by Phil Harding and was later included on Chrysalis Records/EMI's 1999 compilation Most of All: The Best of Deborah Harry. 

The accompanying music video was directed by designer Stephen Sprouse.

Track listing
All tracks (Deborah Harry, Chris Stein & Toni C.) unless otherwise noted.

US cassette
"Sweet and Low" (Phil Harding Single Version) – 4:17
"Lovelight" (Chris Stein) – 3:55

US 12-inch
"Sweet and Low" (Sweet House Mix) – 7:01
"Sweet and Low" (Sweet House Dub) – 6:32
"Lovelight" (Chris Stein) – 3:55
"Sweet and Low" (Swing Low Mix) – 7:44
"Sweet and Low" (Swing Low Dub) – 6:23
"Sweet and Low" (Sweet Chariot Mix) – 7:14

US 12-inch
"Sweet and Low" (Phil Harding 12" Mix)
"Sweet and Low" (Phil Harding Dub)
"Lovelight" (LP Version)
"Sweet and Low" (Sweet House Mix)
"Sweet and Low" (Sweet House Dub)
"Sweet and Low" (Swing Low Mix)

US CD 
"Sweet and Low" (Swing Low Mix) – 7:44
"Sweet and Low" (Sweet Chariot Mix) – 7:14
"Lovelight" (Chris Stein) – 3:55
"Sweet and Low" (Sweet House Mix) – 7:01

US CD
"Sweet and Low" (Single Version)
"Sweet and Low" (LP Edit)
"Sweet and Low" (Phil Harding 12" Mix)
"Lovelight" (LP Version)
"Sweet and Low" (Sweet House Mix)
"Sweet and Low" (Swing Low Mix)

UK 7-inch, poster sleeve 7-inch and cassette
"Sweet and Low" (Phil Harding 7" Mix) – 3:46
"Lovelight" (Chris Stein) – 3:55

UK 12-inch and 12-inch picture disc 
"Sweet and Low" (Phil Harding Remix) – 6:45
"Sweet and Low" (Phil Harding Dub) – 4:51
"Sweet and Low" (Phil Harding 7" Mix) – 3:46

UK CD
"Sweet and Low" (Phil Harding Radio Edit) – 3:30
"Sweet and Low" (Phil Harding Dub) – 4:51
"Sweet and Low" (Phil Harding Single Version) – 4:17

Charts

References

Debbie Harry songs
1990 singles
Songs written by Debbie Harry
Songs written by Chris Stein
1989 songs
Sire Records singles
Chrysalis Records singles